The Delirium Blues Project: Serve or Suffer is the first album released under the joint leadership of Roseanna Vitro and Kenny Werner. It was recorded live at the Blue Note in New York in August 2007, and released in 2008 on the Half Note label.

Reception 
On a 1-to-5 scale, All About Jazz awarded the album 3 stars; AllMusic, 4 and a half. Writing for the former, Chris Slawecky notes Werner's "head-spinning arrangements," as well as strong soloing from trumpeter Randy Brecker, trombonist Ray Anderson, saxophonist James Carter, guitarist Adam Rogers and Werner himself on multiple keyboards.  AllMusic's Ken Dryden also cites "Werner's inspired charts," as well as "Vitro's expressive vocals":
Vitro's moving vocal in the moody "Blue" (first recorded by Lambert, Hendricks & Ross with Annie Ross singing lead), backed by the dramatic horns, is breathtaking; her blues-drenched take of Mose Allison's "Everybody's Crying Mercy" is pure fun. Bassist John Pattitucci provides Vitro's sole backing for the simmering take of "In the Dark" (in honor of Nina Simone). Folk-rocker Joni Mitchell's "Be Cool" helps to lighten the mood a bit, while Vitro conjures a number of soul singers with her hip take of "Cheater Man."

Track listing
 "What Is Hip?" (Emilio Castillo, John David Garibaldi, Stephen M. Kupka) - 5:59
 "Goodnight Nelda Grebe, the Telephone Company Has Cut Us Off" (Tracy Nelson) - 9:05
 "Blue" (Gildo Mahones, Jon Hendricks) - 7:40
 "Be Cool" (Joni Mitchell) - 4:24
 "Half Moon" (Janis Joplin) - 8:07
 "In the Dark" (Lillian "Lil" Green)  - 5:13
 "Cheater Man" (Spooner Oldham, Dan Penn) - 4:45                                         
 "Everybody's Cryin' Mercy" (Mose Allison) - 6:42
 "Don't Ever Let Nobody Drag Your Spirit Down" (Eric Bibb, Maria Muldaur) - 8:26

Personnel
Roseanna Vitro – vocals, arrangements
Kenny Werner – keyboards, arrangements
Randy Brecker – trumpet
James Carter – tenor saxophone
Ray Anderson – trombone
Geoff Countryman – baritone saxophone
Adam Rogers – guitar
John Pattitucci – acoustic and electric bass
Rocky Bryant – drums

References
                                                                                                                                                                                                                                                       

2008 live albums
Half Note Records albums
Live blues albums
Live vocal jazz albums
Roseanna Vitro albums
Albums recorded at the Blue Note Jazz Club